Lutf Ali (1716–1794) was a Saraiki  poet from Bahawalpur, Punjab. He was born in the village of Mao in present day Rahim Yar Khan District. He wrote the popular narrative poem Saifalnāma in 1781 based on a tale from the One Thousand and One Nights.

References

Bibliography 

 (requires registration).

Saraiki-language poets
Pakistani poets
Saraiki-language writers
1716 births
1794 deaths
People from Bahawalpur